The 2014–15 Greek A2 Basket League was the 29th season of the Greek A2 Basket League, the second-tier level professional club basketball league in Greece. The winner of the league was Kavala The clubs that were promoted to the top-tier Greek Basket League were Kavala, Arkadikos, and Lavrio. In contrast, the teams that were relegated to the third tier Greek B Basket League were Filippos Veria, Ermis Lagkada, and Ilysiakos Ilysiakos withdrew from the league in the middle of the season, because of economic debts. All the games of Ilysiakos were given back to their opponents with scores of 20–0.

Teams

Standings

 Lavrio was promoted to the Greek Basket League because KAOD withdrew from the league.
 Filippos Veroias remained in the A2, after a decision of ASEAD (Greek sports court).
 Ermis Lagkada had -1 point.

Top scorers

See also
2014–15 Greek Basketball Cup
2014–15 Greek Basket League (1st tier)

References

External links
Greek A2 Basketball League
League Standings at the Hellenic Basketball Federation  

Greek A2 Basket League
Greek
2014–15 in Greek basketball